Roby Järventie is a Finnish professional ice hockey left winger currently playing for the Belleville Senators of the American Hockey League (AHL) as a prospect to the Ottawa Senators of the National Hockey League (NHL).

Playing career
Jarventie was drafted in the second round of the 2020 NHL Entry Draft by the Senators with the 33rd overall pick. On 27 April, 2021, Järventie was signed to a three-year, entry-level deal with the Senators.

Career statistics

Regular season and playoffs

International

References

External links

2002 births
Living people
Belleville Senators players
Finnish ice hockey left wingers
Ilves players
Finnish ice hockey players
Ottawa Senators draft picks
Ice hockey people from Tampere
21st-century Finnish people